Erich Wolf Segal (June 16, 1937January 17, 2010) was an American author, screenwriter, educator, and classicist who wrote the bestselling novel Love Story (1970) and its hit film adaptation.

Early life and education
Born and raised in a Jewish household in Brooklyn, New York, Segal was the first of three brothers. His father was a rabbi and his mother was a homemaker. His interest in writing and narrating stories developed as a child. He went to Midwood High School, during which he suffered a serious accident while canoeing. His coach advised him to jog as a part of his rehabilitation, which ended up becoming his passion and caused him to participate in the Boston Marathon more than 12 times. He attended Harvard College, graduating as both the class poet and Latin salutatorian in 1958, and then obtained his master's degree (in 1959) and a doctorate (in 1965) in comparative literature from Harvard University, after which he started teaching at Yale.

Writing career
In 1967, through connections on Broadway, Segal was given the opportunity to collaborate on the screenplay for the Beatles' 1968 motion picture Yellow Submarine, based on a story by Lee Minoff.

His first academic book, Roman Laughter: The Comedy of Plautus (1968), published by the Harvard University Press, gave him considerable recognition and chronicled the great Roman comic playwright who inspired the Broadway hit A Funny Thing Happened on the Way to the Forum (1962).

In the late 1960s, Segal collaborated on other screenplays. He wrote a romantic story about a Harvard student and a Radcliffe student but failed to sell it. Literary agent Lois Wallace at the William Morris Agency then suggested he turn the script into a novel, and the result was Love Story (1970). A New York Times No. 1 bestseller, the book became the top selling work of fiction for 1970 in the United States, and was translated into 33 languages worldwide. The motion picture of the same name was the number one box office attraction of 1970.

The novel proved problematic for Segal. He acknowledged that its success unleashed "egotism bordering on megalomania" and he was denied tenure at Yale. Moreover, Love Story "was ignominiously bounced from the nomination slate of the National Book Awards after the fiction jury threatened to resign." Segal later said that the book "totally ruined me." He would go on to write more novels and screenplays, including the 1977 sequel to Love Story, titled Oliver's Story.

Segal published scholarly works on Greek and Latin literature and taught Greek and Latin literature at Harvard, Yale and Princeton universities. He was a Supernumerary Fellow and an Honorary Fellow of Wolfson College at Oxford University. He served as a visiting professor at Princeton, the University of Munich and Dartmouth College. 

His novel The Class (1985), a saga based on the Harvard Class of 1958, was a bestseller, and won literary honors in France and Italy. Doctors (1988) was another New York Times bestseller. In 2001, he published a book on the history of theatre called The Death of Comedy.

Marathons
Segal was an accomplished competitive runner. He had been a sprinter at Midwood High School, and ran the two-mile at Harvard College. He began marathon running during his second year at Harvard, when track and field head coach Bill McCurdy was impressed with how fast he had run 10 miles. Segal ran in the Boston Marathon almost every year from 1955 to 1975. He finished in 79th place at 3 hours, 43 minutes in his first attempt, and his best performance was in 1964 when he finished 63rd with a time of 2:56:30. He recounted that, after one Boston marathon, someone yelled, "Hey, Segal, you run better than you write".

Segal was a color commentator for Olympic marathons during telecasts of both the 1972 and 1976 Summer Olympics. His most notable broadcast was in 1972, when he and Jim McKay called Frank Shorter's gold-medal-winning performance. After an impostor, West German student Norbert Sudhaus, ran into Olympic Stadium ahead of Shorter, an emotionally upset Segal yelled, "That is an impostor! Get him off the track! This happens in bush league marathons! This doesn't happen in an Olympic marathon! Throw the bum out! Get rid of that guy!" When Shorter appeared to be confused by the events, Segal yelled, "come on, Frank, you won it!" and "Frank, it's a fake, Frank!"

In 2000, The Washington Post included the incident among the 10 most memorable American sports calls (albeit misquoting the latter line as being "it's a fraud, Frank!"). In a 2010 posthumous tribute to Segal, marathon runner Amby Burfoot called Segal's call "one of the most unprofessional, unbridled, and totally appropriate outbursts in the history of Olympic TV commentary", taking into consideration the fact that Segal had taught Shorter at Yale.

Personal life

Family
Segal was married to Karen James from 1975 until his death; they had two daughters, Miranda and Francesca Segal. Francesca, born in 1980, is a freelance journalist, literary critic, and columnist.

Death
Segal, who suffered from Parkinson's disease, died of a heart attack on January 17, 2010, and was buried in London. In a eulogy delivered at his funeral, his daughter Francesca said, "That he fought to breathe, fought to live, every second of the last 30 years of illness with such mind-blowing obduracy, is a testament to the core of who he was – a blind obsessionality that saw him pursue his teaching, his writing, his running and my mother, with just the same tenacity. He was the most dogged man any of us will ever know."

Books
 1970: Love Story
 1973: Fairy Tale
 1977: Oliver's Story
 1981: Man, Woman and Child
 1985: The Class
 1988: Doctors
 1992: Acts of Faith
 1995: Prizes
 1997: Only Love

Filmography
 1968: Yellow Submarine
 1970: The Games
 1970: R. P. M.
 1970: Love Story
 1971: Jennifer on My Mind
 1978: Oliver's Story
 1980: A Change of Seasons
 1983: Man, Woman and Child

Bibliography

See also
Love means never having to say you're sorry

References

External links

 Official Erich Segal Website
 
 

1937 births
2010 deaths
20th-century American novelists
American classical scholars
American male novelists
American male screenwriters
American romantic fiction novelists
Writers from Brooklyn
Harvard College alumni
Classical scholars of Yale University
Classical scholars of Harvard University
Classical scholars of Princeton University
Jewish American novelists
Best Screenplay Golden Globe winners
Scholars of ancient Greek literature
Scholars of Latin literature
Midwood High School alumni
20th-century American male writers
Novelists from New York (state)
Novelists from Massachusetts
Novelists from Connecticut
Screenwriters from New York (state)
Screenwriters from Massachusetts
Screenwriters from Connecticut
21st-century American Jews